The Roman Catholic Diocese of Eshowe is a diocese located in the city of Eshowe in the Ecclesiastical province of Durban in South Africa.

History
 August 27, 1921: Established as Apostolic Prefecture of Zululand from the Apostolic Vicariate of Natal
 December 11, 1923: Promoted as Apostolic Vicariate of Eshowe
 January 11, 1951: Promoted as Diocese of Eshowe

Special churches
The Cathedral is the Cathedral of St. Therese of the Little Flower in Eshowe.

Leadership
 Prefect Apostolic of Zululand (Roman rite) 
 Bishop Thomas Spreiter, O.S.B. (1921-08-27 – 1923-12-11 see below)
 Vicars Apostolic of Eshowe (Roman rite) 
 Bishop Thomas Spreiter, O.S.B. (see above 1923-12-11 – 1943-05-14)
 Bishop Aurelian Bilgeri, O.S.B. (1947-06-12 – 1951-01-11 see below)
 Bishops of Eshowe (Roman rite)
 Bishop Aurelian Bilgeri, O.S.B. (see above 1951-01-11 – 1973-07-24)
 Bishop Mansuet Dela Biyase (1975-02-28 – 2005-06-26)
 Bishop Thaddaeus Kumalo (since 2008-03-11)

See also
Roman Catholicism in South Africa

References

External links
 GCatholic.org 
 Catholic Hierarchy 
 Diocese of Eshowe website

Eshowe
Christian organizations established in 1921
Roman Catholic dioceses and prelatures established in the 20th century
1921 establishments in South Africa
KwaZulu-Natal
Roman Catholic Ecclesiastical Province of Durban